Janice Blackie-Goodine is a set decorator. She was nominated for an Academy Award in the category Best Art Direction for the film Unforgiven, and was co-winner with Carol Spier of the Genie Award for Best Art Direction/Production Design for the film Passchendaele at the 29th Genie Awards.

Selected filmography
 Unforgiven (1992)
 The Assassination of Jesse James by the Coward Robert Ford (2007)
 Passchendaele (2008)

References

External links

Year of birth missing (living people)
Living people
Canadian set decorators
Canadian production designers
Best Art Direction/Production Design Genie and Canadian Screen Award winners